Honigman LLP (commonly referred to as Honigman) is a law firm founded in Detroit with over 350 attorneys in eight offices. The firm ranked 135th on The American Lawyer's 2019 AmLaw 200 rankings of U.S. law firms.

History

In 1948, Detroit-based attorneys Jason L. Honigman and Milton J. Miller founded Honigman, which would grow to become one of the largest law firms in Michigan over the next decades. In 2015, Honigman merged with Chicago-based law firm, Schopf & Weiss to establish its first Illinois office. In 2019, Honigman changed its name from "Honigman Miller Schwartz and Cohn LLP" to "Honigman LLP."

Offices

 Ann Arbor, Michigan
 Bloomfield Hills, Michigan
 Chicago, Illinois 
 Detroit, Michigan (Headquarters)
 Grand Rapids, Michigan
 Kalamazoo, Michigan
 Lansing, Michigan
 Washington, DC

Practice areas

Honigman's attorneys practice in more than 60 different areas of concentration:

 Advertising and Marketing
 Affordable Housing
 Antitrust and Trade Regulation
 Appellate Advocacy
 Arbitration, Mediation, and Alternative Dispute Resolution
 Asia-Pacific
 Automotive and Manufacturing
 Autonomous Vehicle
 Biotechnology
 Broker-Dealers and Investment Advisors
 Cannabis
 Captive Insurance
 Class Actions
 Commercial Transactions
 Complex Commercial Litigation
 Construction Planning
 Corporate
 Data, Privacy and Cybersecurity
 e-Discovery and Information Management
 Economic Development Incentives
 Election and Campaign Finance Laws
 Emerging Companies
 Employee Benefits and Executive Compensation
 Employment Counseling and Strategic Workforce Planning
 Employment Litigation
 Environmental
 Finance
 Financial Institutions
 Government Relations and Regulatory
 Health Care
 Hospitality and Lodging
 Immigration
 Industrial and Office
 Insurance
 Insurance and Reinsurance Recovery
 Insurance Tax
 Intellectual Property
 Intellectual Property Litigation
 International Transactions
 Investigations and White Collar Defense
 Israel
 Labor and Employment
 Labor/Management Relations
 Leasing
 Lending and Finance
 Life Sciences
 Life Sciences Intellectual Property Litigation
 Litigation
 Matrimonial and Family Law
 Media and Entertainment
 Mergers and Acquisitions
 Multifamily and Manufactured Housing
 Noncompete Agreements and Trade Secrets
 Patent
 Patent Office Trials
 Private Equity
 Private Equity Litigation
 Product Liability
 Public Company, Securities and Governance
 Real Estate
 Restructuring and Insolvency
 Restructuring, Workouts and Loan Sales
 Retail
 Securities and Corporate Governance
 Securities and Corporate Governance Litigation
 State and Local Tax (SALT)
 Sustainability and Renewable Energy
 Tax
 Tax Appeals
 Technology Transactions
 Trademark and Copyright
 Urban Redevelopment
 Venture Capital
 Wage and Hour Matters
 Zoning and Land Use

Notable people
 Avern Cohn, senior judge of the United States District Court for the Eastern District of Michigan
 Jason L. Honigman, founding partner
 Mark A. Goldsmith, judge of the United States District Court for the Eastern District of Michigan
 Carl Levin, former United States Senator from Michigan
 Milton J. Miller, founding partner
 Raymond Kethledge, judge of the United States Court of Appeals for the Sixth Circuit
 Scott Romney, Republican politician, member of the Romney family

References

External links
 Official Firm Website
 NALP Forms
 Martindale.com
 The National Law Review

Law firms based in Detroit
1948 establishments in Michigan
Law firms based in Chicago